Sklansky is a surname. Notable people with the surname include:

David Sklansky (born 1947), American poker player and writer
David Alan Sklansky, American lawyer